Pink Lake is a meromictic lake located in Gatineau Park, Quebec, Canada. The surface of the waters are a deep green during the month of August and September due to the abundance of algae in the water. The lake is in danger of eutrophication due to human activities. Park management forbids swimming in the lake, walking domestic animals near it, straying from the wooden boardwalk for sight-seers, and throwing stones into the lake.

History 
Pink Lake is named after a family of Irish settlers who in 1826 cleared a farm in the area. It used to be a salt water lake as a part of the oceans. It took over 3000 years for the lake to turn from salt water to fresh water (generally a lake of this size shouldn't take over a few decades) and as a result some of the salt water fishes adapted to fresh water.

Properties 
Due to the meromictic properties of Pink Lake there are ancient forms of bacteria which use sulfur instead of oxygen to perform photosynthesis. These bacteria form a layer about 7 metres from the bottom to avoid the oxygenated water and maximize sunlight exposure.

Pink Lake also has a desalinized variant of the three-spined stickleback fish.

In 2006, research was in progress to identify the patterns of atmospheric conditions over the past 10,000 years by examining the annual deposits of sediment in Pink Lake.

Popular culture
Pink Lake plays a symbolic role in the novel Wash This Blood Clean From My Hand by Fred Vargas.

References

External links

Official NCC webpage
Pink Lake, an Important Paleoclimatic Record
Pink Lake in Gatineau Park's photo gallery
Pink Lake on Photobase (first several images)

Lakes of Outaouais
Landforms of Gatineau
Meromictic lakes